Çilligöl is a village in the Çayırlı District, Erzincan Province, Turkey. The village is populated by Kurds of the Alan and Lolan tribes and had a population of 71 in 2021.

The hamlet of Arıtaş is attached to the village.

References 

Villages in Çayırlı District
Kurdish settlements in Erzincan Province